Colegio La Salle Simón Bolívar is a private school system in Mexico City. It has two campuses: the Galicia Campus in Colonia Insurgentes, Mixcoac, Benito Juárez and the Mixcoac campus in Col. Florida, Mixcoac. The former has primary school and the latter has middle and senior high school.

References

External links
 Colegio La Salle Simón Bolívar

Benito Juárez, Mexico City
High schools in Mexico City